The Courage to Love is a 2000 television history film starring Vanessa L. Williams,  who was also the producer. The premiere was held 24 January 2000 on Lifetime. The film also stars Vanessa's children: Jillian Hervey, Melanie Hervey, Devin Hervey, and her brother Chris Williams. Filming began in August 1999 in Toronto, Ontario, Canada, and was scheduled to last two months.

Plot
Henriette Delille, a free woman of color, was born in 1813 into one of New Orleans' most prominent families. Her family assumed she would follow her mother and sister's path and become a mistress for a wealthy white man. However, Henriette had different plans for her life.

Cast
 Vanessa Williams as Mother Henriette Delille
 Gil Bellows as Dr. Gerard Gautier
 Karen Williams as Julie Gadin
 Lisa Bronwyn Moore as Marie Alicot
 David La Haye as Father Rousselon
 Cynda Williams as Cecelia Delille
 Diahann Carroll as Pouponne
 Stacy Keach as Jean Baptiste
 Kevin Jubinville as Frank Morgan
 Chris Williams as Master of Ceremonies

External links
 

2000 films
2000 television films
Lifetime (TV network) films
African-American films
Canadian drama television films
Black Canadian films
English-language Canadian films
Films shot in Toronto
Films directed by Kari Skogland
Films set in New Orleans
Films set in the 19th century
Sisters of the Holy Family (Louisiana)
American drama television films
2000s American films
2000s Canadian films